Pavlo Vasylovych Pavlish (born 10 December 1979) is a Ukrainian politician currently serving as a People's Deputy of Ukraine from Servant of the People, representing Ukraine's 182nd electoral district since 29 August 2019.

Early life and career 

Prior to his election, Pavlish was a lecturer at Kherson State Agricultural University and director of Pravochyn Law Firm. He is additionally the founder of Euro Trade Engineering LLC and the non-governmental organisation "Skadovsk, Our Home".

Political career 
Before being elected as a People's Deputy of Ukraine, Pavlish unsuccessfully campaigned to become a member of the Kherson Oblast Council in 2006, 2010, and 2015. He also worked as an assistant to Governor of Kherson Oblast Andrii Gordieiev at public events.

During the 2019 Ukrainian presidential election, Pavlish headed the campaign of Volodymyr Zelenskyy in Kherson Oblast.

People's Deputy of Ukraine 
Pavlish ran in the 2019 Ukrainian parliamentary election as the candidate of Servant of the People to be People's Deputy of Ukraine from Ukraine's 182nd electoral district. At the time of the election, he was an independent. He was successfully elected, defeating former People's Deputy and future Russian collaborationist leader Volodymyr Saldo (Opposition Platform — For Life) with 38.80% of the vote to Saldo's 16.10%.

In the Verkhovna Rada (parliament of Ukraine), Pavlish joined the Servant of the People faction, as well as the Verkhovna Rada Legal Committee. On 5 October 2022, he became deputy chairman of the committee.

References 

1979 births
Living people
Ninth convocation members of the Verkhovna Rada
People from Kherson Oblast
Servant of the People (political party) politicians